The Sula rat (Rattus elaphinus) is a species of rodent in the family Muridae.
It is found only in Indonesia, on Taliabu and Mangole islands in the Sula Archipelago. On Sanana island, only the introduced Rattus tanezumi and Rattus exulans are found.

References

Rattus
Rats of Asia
Endemic fauna of Indonesia
Fauna of Sulu
Rodents of Indonesia
Mammals described in 1941
Taxonomy articles created by Polbot